Kharkush ( is a mountain of the Hindu Kush mountain range in Baghlan province in Afghanistan.

Mountains of Afghanistan
Three-thousanders of the Hindu Kush
Landforms of Baghlan Province